Mata Gujri (Gurmukhi: ਮਾਤਾ ਗੁਜਰੀ; mātā gujarī; 1624–1705), also spelt as Mata Gujari, was the wife of Guru Tegh Bahadur, the ninth Guru of Sikhism, and the mother of Guru Gobind Singh, the tenth Guru of Sikhism.

Biography
Mata Gujri was born to Bhāī Lāl Chand, a Subhikkhī Khatri and Bishan Kaur, who lived at Kartarpur.

She was betrothed to Guru Tegh Bahadur in 1629 when he visited Kartarpur for the marriage celebrations of his brother, Suraj Mal. She married Guru Tegh Bahadur at Kartarpur on 4 February 1633 and joined her husband's family in Amritsar. In 1635 the family moved to Kiratpur and, on the death in 1644 of Guru Tegh Bahadur's father, Guru Hargobind, Mata Gujri moved with her husband and mother-in-law, Mata Nanaki, to Bakala, near Amritsar.Soon after he was installed as Guru in 1664, Guru Tegh Bahadur founded a new village, which he called Chakk Nanaki, after his mother. The place, now a city, is now known as Anandpur Sahib. Not long after this, the Guru set out on a long journey, leaving his wife and mother-in-law at Patna.

On 22 December 1666 Mata Gujri gave birth to Gobind Rai, who later became Guru Gobind Singh. Guru Tegh Bahadur returned to Patna in 1670 and instructed the family to leave for Lakhnaur. Mata Gujri reached Lakhnaur on 13 September 1670 and was accompanied by the aged Mata Nanaki and her son, Guru Gobind Singh. At Lakhnaur, she stayed with her brother, Mehar Chand. After Lakhnaur, the family proceeded to Chakk Nanaki (now known as Anandpur Sahib) where Guru Tegh Bahadur rejoined them in March 1671. After the martyrdom of Guru Tegh Bahadur, the responsibility for managing the affairs of Chakk Nanaki fell to her at first as Guru Gobind Rai was still young. Her younger brother, Kirpal Chand, assisted her in this affair.

Later life 
During the evacuation of Anandpur during the Mughal siege of Anandpur in December 1704 or 1705, she was accompanied by Zorawar Singh and Fateh Singh (younger two sons of Guru Gobind Singh) when they became separated from the main group of evacuees whilst crossing the Sarsa rivulet, as a battle took place between the Sikh evacuees and pursuing Mughal troops. A servant, named Gangu, led Mata Gujri and her two younger grandchildren to his village named Saheri, located in present-day Ropar district. There he deceitfully betrayed them to a local Muslim officer and the three were arrested on 8 December. After this, they were confined to the Thanda Burj (cold tower) located at the fort of Sirhind. On the same day as the execution of the younger Sahibzades, Mata Gujri died in the cold tower. Seth Todar Mal, whom was a benevolent and wealthy local of Sirhind, cremated the three the next day.

It is said that Todar Mal of Sirhind paid heavy price of gold coins standing on their edge to recover the bodies of Mata Gujri and the Sahibzades.

Legacy

See also 

 Moti Ram Mehra
 Saka Sirhind
 Diwan Todar Mal
 Shaheedi Jor Mela

References

Citation

Sources
 

Sikh martyrs
Family members of the Sikh gurus
Punjabi people
1624 births
1705 deaths